Matiko is the northern terminus of line 3 of the Bilbao metro. The station is also served by Euskotren Trena commuter and regional rail services. The station is located in the neighborhood of Matiko-Ciudad Jardín, part of the Uribarri district of Bilbao. In its current form, the station opened on 8 April 2017.

History 

The original station, named Matico, opened on 30 June 1887 as part of the narrow-gauge Bilbao-Las Arenas railway, which connected the city of Bilbao with Getxo. Matico was also the terminus station of the Matico-Azbarren railway, a narrow-gauge mostly underground suburban railway that connected the peripheral municipality of Basauri with central Bilbao at Matico. The station was an open-air station located in a trench in the Matiko neighbourhood; to the south the railtracks entered two different tunnels, one headed to Bilbao-San Agustín station, terminus of the Bilbao-Las Arenas railway, and another towards Azbarren, as part of the Matico-Azbarren railway, whereas to the north a single railtrack continued to the University of Deusto station. In 1904 it was integrated into the Bilbao-Plencia railway, and a third tunnel was opened towards Bilbao-Aduana station, which replaced Bilbao-San Agustín as the terminus station of the line.

During the early 20th century, three different railway lines called or passed through Matico station; the passenger Bilbao-Plencia and Matico-Azbarren railways and freight trains headed to Bilbao-San Agustín station. Matico station became a relevant hub for the city's narrow gauge railways, due to being the location of where the single railtrack coming from Getxo and Plentzia branched into three different tunnels. In 1947 the city's narrow gauge railways merged to form the Ferrocarriles y Transportes Suburbanos de Bilbao S.A. (Railways and Suburban Transport of Bilbao), shortened FTS and the first precedent of today's Metro Bilbao. The branch towards Bilbao-San Agustín was closed down in 1973 In 1977 the FTS network was transferred to the public company FEVE and in 1982 to the recently created Euskotren. The station, then renamed Matiko following the modern Basque orthography, was then part of a series of renovation projects commissioned by the Basque Government which included the creation of the Metro Bilbao's line 1 using sections of the Bilbao-Plencia and Matico-Azbarren railways, which caused Matiko to become disconnected from both lines, as the station was not part of the new metro network. The tunnel and railtrack connecting the station with Azbarren were closed down.

After the opening of Metro Bilbao in 1995, Matiko was integrated into the new Txorierri line operated separately by Euskotren and that ran between Deusto and Zazpi Kaleak through the sections that had not been integrated into the metro network, and from there to Lezama in the Txorierri valley. The station was partially renovated with a new island platform, while maintaining the original open-air structure of the original station.

The project for metro line 3 was made public in 2007. The new line was planned to connect Etxebarri and Matiko through the Otxarkoaga-Txurdinaga district and the old town. The project involved the renovation of the Matiko station, and the works were commissioned in 2010. The new project involved Matiko becoming the northern terminus of the new line, before connecting to a new tunnel through Mount Artxanda to ensure connection with the existing Txorierri line. As a consequence, the section between Deusto and Matiko, the last remaining from the former Bilbao-Plencia line, were dismantled, shutting down the services in Deusto and Deusto-University stations in 2010. Matiko station was also closed down to be demolished, with the plans of a new one to be built in its place.

The new underground Matiko station opened on 8 April 2017, integrated into Metro Bilbao's line 3, which is operated by Euskotren Trena.

Future 

The station will be the southern terminus of a new line connecting the city centre with the Bilbao Airport. The new line will use the existing tunnel through Mount Artxanda and will be operated by Euskotren Trena. Studies are underway for Metro Bilbao's line 4, which is planned to also begin at Matiko station and will connect with Bilbao's southern neighbourhoods in the Errekalde district.

Station layout 

Matiko is a partially underground station, built on the site of a former railway trench in the district of Uribarri in Bilbao.

Entrances 

  30 Tiboli St.
   21 Tiboli St.

Services 

Unlike the two other lines of the Bilbao metro system (which are operated by Metro Bilbao S.A.), line 3 is operated by Euskotren, which runs it as part of the Euskotren Trena network. Trains from the Bilbao-San Sebastián, Txorierri and Urdaibai lines of the network run through line 3.

References

External links
 

Line 3 (Bilbao metro) stations
Euskotren Trena stations
Railway stations in Spain opened in 2017
2017 establishments in the Basque Country (autonomous community)
Railway stations in Spain opened in 1887
Railway stations closed in 2010
2010 disestablishments in Spain
Buildings and structures in Bilbao
Buildings and structures demolished in 2010